The Villages Soccer Club is an American soccer club from The Villages, Florida that plays in USL League Two.

In January 2016, it was announced that the club had been granted a franchise license for the Premier Development League.

The team won their division in their first season with a record of 9 wins, 3 losses and 2 ties. They lost to the Midland/Odessa Sockers 2–1 in the Southern Conference Semifinals.

After playing at The Villages Polo Field since their first season, The Villages SC broke ground on a soccer-specific facility in nearby Summerfield, Florida on 23 February 2019. The team played their first home match of the 2019 season at The Villages SC Complex on 8 June 2019.

Year-by-year

Current squad

Honors
USL PDL Southern Conference
Champions: 2018
USL PDL Southeast Division
Champions: 2016
USL League Two Southeast Division
Champions: 2019, 2021

References 

Soccer clubs in Florida
Sumter County, Florida
2008 establishments in Florida
Association football clubs established in 2008